The University of Kansas' men's basketball team plays at the Division I level of the National Collegiate Athletics Association (NCAA) in the Big 12 Conference. The men's basketball program officially began in 1898, following the arrival of Dr. James Naismith to the school, just six years after Naismith had written the sport's first official rules. Kansas has had only eight head coaches in the 120 years of basketball at the University of Kansas.

References

Kansas
Kansas Jayhawks basketball head coaches